Isa Abduldzhalilovich Baytiyev (born 2 December 1966) is a Russian professional football coach and a former player.

He is the manager of the Under-19 squad of FC Akhmat Grozny in the Russian Premier League.

External links
 

1966 births
Living people
Soviet footballers
Russian footballers
FC Akhmat Grozny players
FC Angusht Nazran players
Russian football managers
FC Akhmat Grozny managers
Russian Premier League managers
Association football defenders